Tadeusz Chudecki (born 19 August 1958 in Szczecin) is a Polish actor. He appeared in the comedy television series Bao-Bab, czyli zielono mi in 2003.

References

1958 births
Living people
Actors from Szczecin
Polish male television actors